Otter Lake (Nova Scotia) could mean the following:

By county

Cape Breton Regional Municipality
Otter Lake at 
Otter Lake at

Cumberland County
Otter Lake at

Guysborough County
 Otter Lake at 
 Otter Lake at 
 Otter Lake at 
 Otter Lake at 
 Otter Lake at 
 Otter Lake at

Halifax Regional Municipality
 Otter Lake at 
 Otter Lake at 
 Otter Lake at 
 Otter Lake at 
 Otter Lake at 
 Otter Lake at 
 Otter Lake at 
 Otter Lake at 
 Otter Lake at 
 Otter Lake at 
 Otter Lakes at

Lunenburg County
 Otter Lake at  
 Otter Lake at  
 Otter Lake at

Victoria County
 Otter Lakes at

Yarmouth County
 Otter Lake at

Other

Rivers
 Otter Lake Brook in Halifax Regional Municipality at 
 Otter Lake Brook in Halifax Regional Municipality at 
 Otter Lake Brook in Hants County at

Communities
Otter Lake an Unincorporated area in the Halifax Regional Municipality

References
Geographical Names Board of Canada
Explore HRM
Nova Scotia Placenames

Lakes of Nova Scotia